Craig Island is an island in the Republic of Trinidad and Tobago.  It is one of “The Five Islands” group of six small islands lying west of Port of Spain in the Gulf of Paria.  Craig Island is joined to Caledonia Island by a small causeway.  The island is currently under the protection of the National Trust of Trinidad and Tobago as a heritage site.

See also
 List of islands of Trinidad and Tobago

References

Islands of Trinidad and Tobago
Gulf of Paria